Pseudoneurospora is a genus of fungi within the Sordariaceae family. This is a monotypic genus, containing the single species Pseudoneurospora amorphoporcata.

References

External links
Pseudoneurospora at Index Fungorum

Sordariales
Monotypic Sordariomycetes genera